The 1968 Washington Senators season involved the Senators finishing 10th in the American League with a record of 65 wins and 96 losses.

Offseason 
 February 13, 1968: Tim Cullen, Buster Narum and Bob Priddy were traded by the Senators to the Chicago White Sox for Dennis Higgins, Steve Jones, and Ron Hansen.

Regular season 
 July 30, 1968, Ron Hansen of the Senators turned an unassisted triple play. He caught a line drive, touched second base and tagged the runner coming from first base.

Opening Day starters 
 Paul Casanova
 Frank Coggins
 Mike Epstein
 Ron Hansen
 Frank Howard
 Ken McMullen
 Camilo Pascual
 Del Unser
 Fred Valentine

Season standings

Record vs. opponents

Notable transactions 
 June 7, 1968: 1968 Major League Baseball Draft
Don Castle was drafted by the Senators in the 1st round.
Jim Mason was drafted by the Senators in the 2nd round.
Mike Cubbage was drafted by the Senators in the 6th round, but did not sign.
 August 2, 1968: Ron Hansen was traded by the Senators to the Chicago White Sox for Tim Cullen.

Roster

Player stats

Batting

Starters by position 
Note: Pos = Position; G = Games played; AB = At bats; H = Hits; Avg. = Batting average; HR = Home runs; RBI = Runs batted in

Other batters 
Note: G = Games played; AB = At bats; H = Hits; Avg. = Batting average; HR = Home runs; RBI = Runs batted in

Pitching

Starting pitchers 
Note: G = Games pitched; IP = Innings pitched; W = Wins; L = Losses; ERA = Earned run average; SO = Strikeouts

Other pitchers 
Note: G = Games pitched; IP = Innings pitched; W = Wins; L = Losses; ERA = Earned run average; SO = Strikeouts

Relief pitchers 
Note: G = Games pitched; W = Wins; L = Losses; SV = Saves; ERA = Earned run average; SO = Strikeouts

Awards and honors

League leaders 
Frank Howard, American League leader, Home runs

All-Stars 
All-Star Game

Farm system

Notes

References 
1968 Washington Senators team page at Baseball Reference
1968 Washington Senators team page at www.baseball-almanac.com

Texas Rangers seasons
Washington Senators season
Washing